Oxford Mills is an unincorporated community in Jones County, Iowa, United States. Oxford Mills is located on the Wapsipinicon River, south of Oxford Junction.

History
Oxford Mills was the first settlement in Oxford Township. It was named after a gristmill built there in 1857.

References

Unincorporated communities in Jones County, Iowa
Unincorporated communities in Iowa
1857 establishments in Iowa
Populated places established in 1857